Valko may refer to:

 Valkó (village), a village and commune in the Pest county, Hungary
 Valkó County, a county of the medieval Kingdom of Hungary
 Ernest Valko, murdered Slovak lawyer
 Taras Valko, Belarusian sprint canoer
 Valko Chervenkov, Prime Minister of communist Bulgaria